This is a list of mayors of Carouge, Canton of Geneva, Switzerland. The mayor (maire) chairs the three-member executive of Carouge (Conseil administratif) for one year. The term generally last from June to May the following year.

References 

Carouge
 
Carouge